Fascin is a protein that in humans is encoded by the FSCN1 gene.

Interactions 

FSCN1 has been shown to interact with Low affinity nerve growth factor receptor and PKC alpha.

References

Further reading